Entrench is the fifth studio album by the Canadian rock band KEN mode. The album was released on March 19, 2013 through Season of Mist. Producer of this album is Matt Bayles.

The album was named a longlisted nominee for the 2013 Polaris Music Prize on June 13, 2013.

Track listing

Personnel
Band
 Jesse Matthewson - guitars, vocals, bass, piano, microkorg
 Shane Matthewson - drums
 Andrew LaCour - bass, vocals

Additional musicians
 Tim Singer (Deadguy, Kiss It Goodbye) – guest vocals on "No, I'm in Control"
 Dave Verellen (Botch, Narrows) – guest vocals on "The Promises of God"

Artwork and design
 Ben "Lil Duncan" Bonner – sculpture
 Ryan Klatt – photography
 Randy Ortiz – layout

References

2013 albums
Season of Mist albums
KEN mode albums
Albums produced by Matt Bayles